Stade de Marchan is a multi-use stadium in Tangier, Morocco.  It is used mostly for football matches and used to be the home ground of IR Tanger.  The stadium holds 14,000 people.  It was however replaced by Stade de Tanger after the latter's construction was over.

See also
 Marshan Palace, Tangier

Football venues in Morocco
S
Sport in Tangier